Fault Lines is an American current affairs and documentary television program broadcast on Al Jazeera English. Premiering in November 2009, the program is known for investigative storytelling across the United States and the Americas, examining the United States and its role in the world.

Team
, the program's correspondents are Josh Rushing, Sharif Kouddous, Natasha del Toro, and Femi Oke. Past correspondents include Sebastian Walker, Anjali Kamat, Zeina Awad, Avi Lewis, Teresa Bo, Wab Kinew, and Nagieb Khaja.

Episodes
{{columns-list|colwidth=20em|

 Obama's Policy on Torture (2009) 
 Tale of Two Bankruptcies (2009)
 Collapsing Auto Industry in Detroit (2009)
 Town Hall Debate on Torture (2009)
 California in Crisis (2009)
 Evangelism in the Military (2009)
 Newt Gingrich: Former Speaker of House of Representatives (2009)
 US Admiral Michael Mullen (2009)
 Health Care Reform (2009)
 Obama's Strategy in Afghanistan (2009)
 Harry Belafonte: On Obama and politics of race (2009)
 Mental Illness in America's Prisons (2009)
 The Best of Fault Lines 2009 (2009)
 Honduras: 100 Days of Resistance (2009)
 US Ambassador to Iraq: Christopher Hill (2009)
 Afghanistan & the United States: The Deeper Debate (2009)
 Race and Recession Town Hall (2009)
 US Colombia Base Agreement (2009)

 Rio: Olympic City (2010)
 Obama: Year One (2010)
 Haiti: The Politics of Rebuilding (2010)
 On the brink: Iraq, Kurdistan and the Battle for Kirkuk (2010)
 Cornel West (2010)
 America's Job Crisis, Working through the US job crisis (2010)
 Cyber War (2010)
 Arundhati Roy (2010)
 The Other Debt Crisis: Climate Debt in Bolivia (2010)
 Elderly in Prison (2010)
 In Deep Water - A Way of Life in Peril (2010)
 Danny Glover (2010)
 Haiti: Six Months On (2010)
 General Wesley Clark (2010)
 Illegal America: Arizona's Immigration Fight (2010)
 Politics of Death Row (2010)
 The High and the Mighty (2010)
 Tea Party, Big Money, Twisted maps (2010)
 US Midterm Elections: A Town Hall Debate (2010)
 Fast food, Fat profits: Obesity in America (2010)
 The Other Special Relationship (2010)

 Mexico: Impunity and Profits (2011)
 Mexico's Hidden War (2011)
 Puerto Rico: The Fiscal Experiment (2011)
 Colombia's Gold War (2011)
 Outsourced: Clinical Trials Overseas (2011)
 The US and the New Middle East: Libya (2011)
 The US and the New Middle East: The Gulf (2011)
 The Top 1% (2011)
 Horn of Africa Crisis: Somalia's Famine (2011)
 Horn of Africa Crisis: Drought Zone (2011)
 Politics, Religion, and the Tea Party (2011)
 The Decline of Labor Unions in the US (2011)
 Robot Wars (2011)

 Chile Rising (2012)
 Occupy Wall Street: History of an Occupation (2012)
 Occupy Wall Street: Surviving the Winter (2012)
 Disenfranchised in America (2012)
 Punishment and Profits: Immigration Detention (2012)
 Iraq: After the Americans (2012)
 Controlling the Web (2012)
 The US and Honduras (2012)
 Baltimore: Anatomy of an American City (2012)
 The Abortion War (2012)
 For Sale - The American Dream (2012)
 Conventions 2012: The Price of the Party (2012)
 Fracking in America (2012)
 Battle for the Arctic (2012)

 Elsipogtog: The Fire Over Water (2013)
 Collect it All: America's Surveillance State (2013)
 Chasing Fire (2013)
 Egypt and the U.S. (2013)
 Stolen Wages (2013)
 America's Infant Mortality Crisis (2013)
 Cross Border Killings (2013)
 Life After Guantanamo (2013)
 Haiti in a Time of Cholera (2013)
 Made in Bangladesh (2013)
 America's Hidden Harvest (2013)
 Women Behind Bars (2013)
 Elders Incorporated (2013)

 Ferguson: Race and Justice in the U.S. (2014)
 Wall Street Landlords (2014)
 The Disappeared (2014)
 Opioid Wars (2014)
 Iraq divided: The fight against ISIL (2014)
 No Refuge: Children at the Border (2014)
 Ferguson: City Under Siege (2014)
 The Coverage Gap (2014)
 State of Play: Football Players and the NCAA (2014)
 Wisconsin's Mining Standoff (2014)
 Chasing Bail (2014)
 Water for Coal (2014)
 Mexico's Vigilante State (2014)
 Access Restricted: Abortion in Texas (2014)
 Space Inc. (2014)
 This is Taliban Country (2014)
 On the Front Lines With the Taliban (2014)
 Death in Plain Sight (2014)
 America's War Workers (2014)
 Deadly Force: Arming America's Police (2014)
 Libya: State of Insecurity (2014)
 Colombia: Deadly Fight for Land (2014)
 The Deported: America's Immigration Battle (2014)

 Alaska: When the Water Took the Land (2015)
 Earthquake State (2015)
 One Day in Charkh (2015)
 Conflicted: The Fight Over Congo's Minerals (2015)
 The Puerto Rico Gamble (2015)
 Lost in the System (2015)
 Take as Prescribed: Drug Addiction in the U.S. (2015)
 The Colorado River: a lifeline running dry (2015)
 Under the Microscope: The FBI Hair Cases (2015)
 Forgotten Youth: Inside America's Prisons (2015)
 Invisible Hands (2015)
 Baltimore Rising (2015)
 The Death of Aging (2015)
 South Sudan: Country of Dreams (2015)
 Shadow City (2015)
 Mexico's Disappeared (2015)
 The Disappearing Delta (2015)
 Hidden State: Inside North Korea (2015)
 Death on the Bakken Shale (2015)

 Standing Rock & The Battle Beyond (2016)
 The Anacortes Disaster (2016)
 The Contract: Chicago's Police Union (2016)
 Afghan Translators: Out of Hiding (2016)
 Crypto Wars: Behind the Encryption Debate (2016)
 The Lives of Black Women (2016)
 The Taser Cases (2016)
 Honduras: Blood and the Water (2016)
 The Poison In Our Walls (2016)
 The Trump Takeover (2016)
 The Rise of Trump (2016)
 Albuquerque Police: A History of Violence (2016)
 Afghan Translators: Out of Hiding (2016)
 Dark Prison: The Legacy of the CIA Torture Programme (2016)
 Seafood Slaves (2016)
 The Final Call: Why Firefighters Commit Suicide (2016)
 Survival Mode: Growing Up With Violence (2016)

 Life of the Party (2017)
 The Rollback: Trump's Toxic War (2017)
 Confidential: Surveilling Black Lives (2017)
 Houston After Harvey (2017)
 Hate in Trump's America (2017)
 Heroin's Children (2017)
 Undocumented in Trump's America (2017)
 State of Denial (2017)
 The Trump Show (2017)
 The Prison Factory (2017)
 Guatemala's Disappeared (2017)
 Haiti by Force: UN Sex Abuse (2017)
 The Ban (2017)

 American Sheriff (2018) 
 Puerto Rico: Shelter After the Storm (2018) 
 Between War and the Ban: An American-Yemeni Story (2018) 
 Fire and Fury: Trump's North Korea Crisis (2018) 
 Trump's War on Gangs (2018) 
 This is Antifa: Behind the mask of the US anti-fascist movement (2018) 
}}

Awards

 See also 
 The 90's (1989-1992)
 Vanguard'' (2008-2013)

References

External links
 
 Al Jazeera Official website

Al Jazeera English original programming
Al Jazeera America original programming
2000s American television news shows
2010s American television news shows
2020s American television news shows
Peabody Award-winning television programs
News & Documentary Emmy Award winners
Emmy Award-winning programs